Prince Frederick George William Christopher of Prussia (19 December 1911 – 20 April 1966), also known as Friedrich von Preussen in the United Kingdom, was the fourth son of Crown Prince Wilhelm of Germany and Duchess Cecilie of Mecklenburg-Schwerin.

Marriage
Frederick married Brigid Guinness on 30 July 1945 at Little Hadham. They had five children:

Prince Frederick Nicholas (born 3 May 1946) married non-dynastically, Hon. Victoria Lucinda Mancroft (born 7 March 1952, daughter of Stormont Mancroft, 2nd Baron Mancroft) on 27 February 1980 in London and has issue.
Prince Andreas (born 14 November 1947) married non-dynastically, Alexandra Blahova (28 December 1947 - 8 September 2019) on 2 January 1979, and has issue, including Tatiana von Preussen.
Princess Victoria Marina  (born 22 February 1952) married Philippe Alphonse Achache (born 25 March 1945) on 3 May 1976, and has issue.
Prince Rupert (born 28 April 1955) married non-dynastically, Ziba Rastegar-Javaheri (born 12 December 1954, into a family of wealthy Iranian industrialists) on 5 January 1982 in London, and has issue.
Princess Antonia (born 28 April 1955) who married Charles Wellesley, 9th Duke of Wellington on 3 February 1977 at St. Paul's Church, London, and has issue.

Studies in Britain and internment
He was studying at Cambridge and lived incognito as the Count von Lingen when war broke out in September 1939. He was arrested and interned in May 1940. He was held in Britain for several months and sent to internment camps near Quebec City and soon afterwards in Farnham, Quebec. In both camps, he was elected camp leader by fellow inmates.

British naturalisation in 1947
He renounced his German citizenship in 1947. He was naturalised as a British citizen in October 1947 under the name Friedrich von Preussen (having also been known during residence in the UK as "George Mansfield"). This naturalisation was controversial, in part because being a descendant of Sophia of Hanover, and having rights under the Act of Settlement 1701, as amended by the Sophia Naturalisation Act 1705, he had a claim to British citizenship from birth.   His status in context of his claim for compensation for property seized in Poland was debated in Parliament and the law courts until 1961.

Death
While staying there in 1966, he went missing and was found two weeks later after he had drowned in the Rhine. Whether it was suicide or an accident could not be determined.

Ancestry

Notes

1911 births
1966 deaths
House of Hohenzollern
Prussian princes
People from Berlin
People from the Province of Brandenburg
Deaths by drowning
Accidental deaths in Germany
German emigrants to England
Naturalised citizens of the United Kingdom
People from the Rheingau